The 14th Dallas–Fort Worth Film Critics Association Awards honoring the best in film for 2008 were announced on December 17, 2008. These awards "recognizing extraordinary accomplishment in film" are presented annually by the Dallas–Fort Worth Film Critics Association (DFWFCA), based in the Dallas–Fort Worth metroplex region of Texas. The organization, founded in 1990, includes 32 film critics for print, radio, television, and internet publications based in north Texas. The Dallas–Fort Worth Film Critics Association began presenting its annual awards list in 1991.

Unlike most years, no one film dominated the 2008 DFWFCA awards. Two films led the pack with just two wins each: Slumdog Millionaire took top honors in the Best Picture and Best Director (Danny Boyle) categories while The Dark Knight took Best Supporting Actor (Heath Ledger) and Best Cinematography (Wally Pfister).

Along with the 11 "best of" category awards, the group also presented the Russell Smith Award to Wendy and Lucy as the "best low-budget or cutting-edge independent film" of the year. The award is named in honor of late Dallas Morning News film critic Russell Smith.

Winners
Winners are listed first and highlighted with boldface. Other films ranked by the annual poll are listed in order. While most categories saw 5 honorees named, some categories ranged from as many as 10 (Best Film) to as few as 2 (Best Cinematography, Best Animated Film, Best Screenplay).

Category awards

Individual awards

Russell Smith Award
 Wendy and Lucy, for "best low-budget or cutting-edge independent film"

References

External links
Dallas–Fort Worth Film Critics Association official website

2008
2008 film awards